Dilara Yurtdaş (born 2 October 2004) is a Turkish artistic gymnast. She competed at the 2020 European Championships in Mersin, Turkey.

Yurtdaş took the silver medal in the Junior Floor exercise event at the 2018 Gym Festival Trnava in Slovakia. She won the gold medal in the junior Floor exercise event at the 2019 Gym Festival Trnava in Slovakia. She took silver medals in the Balance beam and Floor exercise events and the bronze medal in the Individual all-around event, as well as the silver medal with her team mates at the 2019 Mediterranean Championships in Cagliari, Italy. She was the gold medalist in the Floor exercise event of the Juniors division at the 2019 Gym Festival Trnava in Slovakia. At the 2019 Stella Zakharova Cup in Kyiv, Ukraine, she won the bronze medal in the Floor exercise and the silver medal in the Individual all-around event, and the silver medal with her team mates in the Juniors division. 

She competed for Beden Terbiyesi S.K. in İzmir in 2015, before she transferred to İzmir Karşıyaka Belediye GSK.

References

External links
 

2004 births
Living people
People from Konak
Sportspeople from İzmir
Turkish female artistic gymnasts
21st-century Turkish women